Saint James the Great's Vision of the Virgin Mary (French - L'Apparition de la Vierge à saint Jacques le Majeur) is a c.1629-1630 oil on canvas painting by Nicolas Poussin, now in the Louvre Museum. It shows a vision in Zaragoza whilst James the Great was evangelising Spain.

History
According to Poussin's biographer Giovanni Pietro Bellori, the work was produced for the town of Valenciennes, then in the Spanish Netherlands, possibly commissioned by a Spanish general as a church altarpiece, perhaps for the church of Saint-Jacques, though no precise location is known. Another biographer dates it to around 1630. It had entered the duc de Richelieu's collection by 13 October 1665, when it was admired there by Gian Lorenzo Bernini during his stay in Paris. The French king acquired it and twelve other Poussin works (including The Four Seasons) in December 1665.

It appears in an inventory of works owned by Charles Le Brun until his death in 1690 in the hôtel de Gramont near the palais du Louvre. Another inventory places it at the château de Versailles from 1695 onwards and specifically in its palais du Luxembourg in 1750. It was one of the works displayed at the Louvre when it first opened in 1793 and - though it was returned to Versailles four years later - it reverted to the Louvre in 1810.

References

Paintings by Nicolas Poussin
1629 paintings
1630 paintings
Paintings of the Virgin Mary
Paintings of James the Great
Paintings in the Louvre by French artists